Exposition Park (or Expo Park) is a neighborhood in south Dallas, Texas (USA). Centered along tree-lined Exposition Avenue, the small enclave stretches from the eastern edge of Deep Ellum to the entrance of Fair Park. The area includes Exposition Plaza, a one acre special use park established in 1984 that features an amphitheater and sculpture areas.

Exposition Park is home to several eclectic bars and restaurants, with small businesses and entertainment venues dotting the street-level storefronts. The neighborhood is also widely known as a budding arts district, attracting many artists and creatives who live and work in the area. Several art galleries, artist and photography studios, and creative offices are located within its borders.

The Gibson Company, a major property owner in the area, has preserved many of the historic buildings and lofts across the neighborhood.

Historic Buildings 
Goodyear Tire & Rubber Company Building, 3809 Parry Avenue, Dallas, TX 75206
B.F. Goodrich Building, 4136-40 Commerce Street, Dallas, TX 75206
Texas Centennial Exposition Buildings, located inside Fair Park, Dallas, TX
Dallas Fire Department Hook and Ladder Company No. 3, 3801 Parry Avenue, Dallas, TX 75206

Attractions 
Dallas Fair Park
Dallas Firefighter's Museum
Exposition Plaza

Businesses

Art Galleries 

Maestri Gallery
The Power Station
Olivier François Galerie

Art and Photography Studios 

 Addison Sloane Artworks
 Beau Bumpass Photography
 CentralTrak (closed 2017)
Center for Art Conservation

Bars and Restaurants 

 Craft and Growler
 The Double Wide Bar
 Eight Bells Alehouse
 Las Almas Rotas
 Noble Coyote Coffee Roasters
 Whiskeys

Fitness and Wellness 

 East Side Athletic Club
 Ruby Room Studio

Hair Salons and Barbershops 

 Dallas Hair Company
 Rob's Chop Shop

Performance Venues 

 Rainbow Vomit
 Sandaga 813
 The Ochre House Theater

Education 
Public schools
The Dallas Independent School District assigned the neighborhood to the following schools:
Elementary School (Grades PK - 5): PAUL L. DUNBAR*
Middle School (Grades 6 - 8): BILLY EARL DADE*
High School (Grades 9 - 12): JAMES MADISON*

Transportation

Trains

Light Rail 
DART: 
Fair Park Station
Google Street View (map)

Highways 
 Interstate 30

References

External links
 Exposition Park community website